Ferdomhnach Dall, Lector of Kildare and harpist, died 1110.

The Annals of Ulster for 1110 list the death of three Irish churchmen, including:

  Ferdomhnach Dall fer leiginn Cille Dara .i.  sui cruitirechta
 

  Ferdomnach the blind, lector of Cell Dara, i.e. a master of harping
 

Ferdomhnach held the important post of fer leiginn (lector), an office associated with men such as [[Áed Ua Forréid]] (d. 1056) and Áed Ua Crimthainn (fl. 12th century), though it was also understood in the sense of a man of learning. He is perhaps the earliest attested Irish musician noted by name, specifically a  sui cruitirechta/a master of harping.

See also

 Clàrsach
 Amhlaeibh Mac Innaighneorach, d. 1168. 
 Aed mac Donn Ó Sochlachain, d. 1224.
 Maol Ruanaidh Cam Ó Cearbhaill, murdered 1329. 
 Turlough O'Carolan, 1670-1738.

References
 Ann Buckley: "Musical Instruments in Ireland 9th–14th Centuries: A Review of the Organological Evidence", in: Musicology in Ireland (= Irish Musical Studies vol. 1), ed. G. Gillen & H. White (Blackrock, Co. Dublin: Irish Academic Press, 1990), pp. 13–57.
 Ann Buckley: "Music and Musicians in Medieval Irish Society", in: Early Music 28 (2000) 2, pp. 165–190.
 Ann Buckley: "Music in Prehistoric and Medieval Ireland", in: A New History of Ireland vol. 1, ed. Dáibhí Ó Cróinín (Oxford: Oxford University Press, 2005), pp. 744–813.

External links
http://www.ucc.ie/celt/published/G100001A/index.html
http://www.ucc.ie/celt/published/T100001A/index.html
http://www.irishharp.org/

1110 deaths
11th-century Irish priests
12th-century Irish Roman Catholic priests
Medieval Irish musicians
Irish harpists
Medieval Gaels from Ireland
Year of birth unknown
People from County Kildare

 None of Buckley's papers, given as sources, mention Ferdomhnach, Ferdomnach, cruitirechta (although there is some discussion of the cruit in "Musical Instruments"),leiginn, or lectors. I was unable to find a reference on the Irish Harp site for any of these keywords.